Isabelle Stead (born 8 October in Leeds, United Kingdom) is a British film director, producer and philanthropist.

In 2008, Stead became a Sundance fellow and alumni.

In 2010 Stead was selected by the British Council as the UK Producer on the Move for Cannes International Film Festival. Stead produced 'Son of Babylon' the film screened at Sundance and Berlin Film Festivals and received the Amnesty and Peace Prize, followed by a British Independent Film Award. The film was selected as Iraq's official entry for the Best Foreign Language Film at the 83rd Academy Awards.

In 2011 Stead produced the documentary 'In My Mother's Arms' that premièred at the Toronto International Film Festival - the film went on to win the Asia Pacific Academy Award for Best Documentary.

In 2012 Stead became an Academy Member of The Asia Pacific Motion Picture Academy of the Arts.

Humanitarian Work
In 2010 Stead established the Iraq's missing campaign and began lobbying for the DNA testing of Iraq's mass graves.

Filmography
 2013 - In The Sands of Babylon
 2011 - In my mother's arms
 2010 - Kosher
 2009 - Son of Babylon
 2005 - Ahlaam

Awards
 2013 Best Film from Arab World for 'In the Sands of Babylon' - Abu Dhabi Film Festival
 2012 Asia Pacific Academy Award
 2010 British Independent Film Award - Raindance Award
 2010 Amnesty International Film Award

External links

Winners of Asia Pacific Academy Award
Human Film website

References

1979 births
Living people
British film directors
People from Leeds
Film people from Yorkshire